The 1998 Segunda División Peruana, the second division of Peruvian football (soccer), as UPAO declined to participate only 11 teams took part in this tournament. Only 1 leg of matches was played as the tournament was delayed because of some problems. The tournament winner, Hijos de Yurimaguas was promoted to the Playoff.

Results

Standings

Relegation playoff

Promotion playoff

External links
 RSSSF

Peruvian Segunda División seasons
Peru2
2